Dark Corner or Dark Corners may refer to:

Dark Corner, New South Wales, a community in Australia
The Dark Corner, a 1946 film
Dark Corners, a 2006 horror film
Dark Corners (novel), a novel by Ruth Rendell